Veppankkadu is a village in the Pattukkottai taluk of Thanjavur district, Tamil Nadu, India.

Demographics 

As per the 2001 census, Veppankkadu had a total population of 964 with 470 males and 494 females. The sex ratio was 1051. The literacy rate was 66.78.

References 

 

Villages in Thanjavur district